A.S.D. Nocerina 1910, known as Nocerina and formerly known as Città di Nocera, is an Italian football club based in Nocera Inferiore, Campania. The club was founded in 2015 by using the sports title of Città di Agropoli, after the major club of the city, A.S.G. Nocerina withdrew from the football leagues. The club was purchased in 2022 by three American businessmen Giancarlo Natale, Raffaele Scalzi, and Louie A. Goros. This marks the first Americans in history to purchase an Italian soccer club in Southern Italy. The club currently plays in Serie D.

History

Città di Agropoli
A.S.D. Città di Agropoli was a football club that attributed to the comune Agropoli but based in Campagna, in the Province of Salerno. The club also played in Angri and Battipaglia in the past. The club was named "Città di Agropoli" but had no relation with U.S. Agropoli 1921, the winner of 2011–12 Eccellenza Campania Group B. Città di Agropoli won Promozione Campania Group D in the same season.

Città di Agropoli played 3 seasons in Eccellenza Campania from 2012 to 2015. In the last season, Città di Agropoli finished as the 12th of Group B, while A.S.G. Nocerina finished as the equal 7th in the same group.

A.S.D. Nocerina 1910
After A.S.G. Nocerina withdrew from the league in 2015, Città di Agropoli, based in Campagna, was merged with A.S.D. Matteo Solferino, a five-a-side football club from Nocera Inferiore. The new club, Associazione Sportiva Dilettantistica Città di Nocera 1910 (A.S.D. Città di Nocera 1910) also headquartered in Nocera Inferiore but inherited the "sports title" of Città di Agropoli in 2015–16 Eccellenza Campania season. The two comuni were from the same province, thus such relocation was allowed in the regulation.

In the first season, Città di Nocera won Eccellenza Campania Group B and the promotion to 2016–17 Serie D season. The club was renamed to "A.S.D. Nocerina 1910" in July 2016.

The club was penalized 3 points in 2018, due one of the predecessors, A.S.D. Matteo Solferino, fielded an ineligible player during 2014–15 season.

Players

Former players

Honours
Eccellenza Campania
Champions: 2015–16 (as Città di Nocera)
Promozione Campania
Champions: 2011–12 (as Città di Agropoli)

References

External links
  

 
Football clubs in Italy
Football clubs in Campania
Association football clubs established in 2015
2015 establishments in Italy
ASD Nocerina 1910
Phoenix clubs (association football)